Play or Die is a 2019 Belgian horror film directed by Jacques Kluger. The film is based on the bestseller novel titled Puzzle by Franck Thilliez. The plot revolves around Lucas (Charley Palmer Rothwell), a young man who participates in a game called Paranoia, which is used as a means to make several atrocities.

The film premiered on 18 April 2019 in the United States, and 10 July 2019 in VOD format.

Plot 
Lucas and Chloé are a former dysfunctional couple who, after having spent a year apart, meet again when Chloé decides to invite him to play a game called Paranoia, which offers a million euros to the two players who finish the game. After gathering the clues and solving puzzles, the two are accepted into the game and arrive at an abandoned hospital where it will take place. Upon entering, they find a handful of other players that have also qualified in the same manner. A mysterious voice suddenly announces the rules of the game as well as how to play but does not tell them two hidden rules: nothing is real, and one of them will die.

Upon starting, Lucas begins to notice oddities in how the game is set up. He assumes the game's organisers are trying to kill every player, but Chloé refuses to believe that anyone wants to kill them all. Shortly after passing the game's first test, they run into the corpse of one of the players. Frightened, Chloé and Lucas try to finish the game to save their lives. In another room, they discover another dead player and some papers with information about Naomi, who was admitted to the hospital years ago and noted as a dangerous patient. Chloé deduces that Naomi must have been committing the murders.

The couple reach the final test, which tasks them with going to the abandoned hospital church. Chloé discovers that Lucas is really the murderer and that he is a psychopath who suffers from memory loss. Chloé makes him believe that they are about to reach the end of the game, finds a ladder to go up to the second floor of the church, then pushes him off and flees. However, he manages to find her and kill her.

Lucas, unaware of what he is doing, "confronts" the murderer and overpowers him in a fight. When he orders the killer to take his mask off, he discovers he shares his face and realizes he is responsible for murdering his mother and organizing the game. He tells police that the murderer has escaped.

Cast 
 Charley Palmer Rothwell as Lucas
 Koah Edwards as Child Lucas
 Igor van Dessel as Teenager Lucas
 Roxane Mesquida as Chloé
 Marie Zabukovec as Naomi
 Thomas Mustin as Jablowski
 Daphné Huynh as Maxine
 Hippolyte de Poucques as Ray
 Caroline Donnelly as Lucas' mother
 Helena Chambon as Nurse
 Laetitia Chambon as Nurse

References

External links 
 

2010s English-language films